Ecrans d'Afrique: Revue Internationale de Cinema Television et Video (also known as African Screen), founded by African filmmakers in Burkina Faso in 1992 during a period of intense worldwide interest and commentary on African T.V. and film, explored all aspects of African film production. It, along with its many contemporaries, sought to ameliorate an intellectual climate which suffered from a dearth of commentary on African film. A corollary of the journal's efforts was to improve worldwide exposure and access to African films - it was linked to the Panafrican Film and Television Festival of Ouagadougou (FESPACO), the continent's leading film festival, from its inception. Ecrans d'Afrique has also been lauded for its wide gaze covering the whole of the African diaspora and for its excellent coverage of Caribbean film developments.

The magazine was published by Fédération panafricaine des cinéastes (Pan African Federation of Filmmakers or FEPACI) on a quarterly basis. It ceased publication in 1998.

References

External links
 archives
African Women Cinema
This article uses text from chimurengalibrary.co.za under the GFDL
 this,this, this, this and Schmidt, Nancy J. "Special Issues of Periodicals on African Film." African Studies Review 40.01 (1997): 113–119.
This contains a detailed annotated bibliography which includes many of the articles from the journal. As does this.

Magazines published in Africa
Film magazines
French-language magazines
Magazines established in 1992
Magazines disestablished in 1998
Quarterly magazines